Rosvik is a locality situated in Piteå Municipality, Norrbotten County, Sweden with 1,735 inhabitants in 2010.

References

External links 
 http://www.rosvik.nu

Populated places in Piteå Municipality
Norrbotten